Huo Liang (born September 29, 1989, in Shanghai) is a Chinese athlete who competes in diving. In addition to his gold medal in the 10m Platform Sync. event at the 2008 Summer Olympics, he dove for 10m Platform event, placing 4th in the final round.

Huo is the only male diver who has won World Championships in Men's synchronized 10-meter platform three consecutive times.
Huo's coach is Yan Hu.

Major achievements
He claimed the gold medal at the 2008 World Cup – 10m platform synchro Event.

References
http://2008teamchina.olympic.cn/index.php/personview/personsen/753 

1986 births
Living people
Divers at the 2008 Summer Olympics
Olympic divers of China
Olympic gold medalists for China
Divers from Shanghai
Olympic medalists in diving
Chinese male divers
Asian Games medalists in diving
Divers at the 2010 Asian Games
Divers at the 2006 Asian Games
Medalists at the 2008 Summer Olympics
World Aquatics Championships medalists in diving
Asian Games gold medalists for China
Asian Games silver medalists for China
Medalists at the 2006 Asian Games
Medalists at the 2010 Asian Games
Universiade medalists in diving
Universiade gold medalists for China
Medalists at the 2011 Summer Universiade
Medalists at the 2013 Summer Universiade
20th-century Chinese people
21st-century Chinese people